
The Prussian Trust, or Prussian Claims Society, is a corporation registered in Düsseldorf, founded in 2000 as Preußische Treuhand GmbH by some descendants of German expellees, and supported by some officials of the  Landsmannschaft Schlesien organization. It seeks to claim compensation from Poland and the Czech Republic, among others, for property confiscated from Germans expelled from territories which after World War II became parts of Poland and Czechoslovakia.

The chairman of the supervisory board is Rudi Pawelka, who also is president of the Landsmannschaft Schlesien, and vice president is Hans Günther Parplies, also vice president of the Federation of Expellees. The Trust probably has fewer than a hundred members.

Compensation claims against Poland
Rudi Pawelka told the Daily Telegraph on 15 February 2004 that: 

The then-German chancellor Gerhard Schröder stated on 1 August 2004 that the German government will not support these claims. Also, the Polish Sejm declared that Poland will demand war reparations from Germany if the German government does not end the press for compensations. Some German politicians stated that the claims by the Sejm were ridiculous and had no legal basis. The corporation's activities have been repudiated by some German politicians who have addressed the issue, including the president of the Federation of Expellees, Erika Steinbach.

In December 2006, the corporation filed 23 individual claims against Poland in the European Court of Human Rights, an action which has been condemned by both the Polish and German governments.

The Polish government decided that the submissions warranted a comment by Anna Fotyga, the Polish Minister of the Foreign Affairs who "express [her] deepest concern upon receiving the information about a claim against Poland submitted by the Prussian Trust to the European Court of Human Rights".

On 9 October 2008 the European Court of Human Rights declared the case of Preussische Treuhand v. Poland  inadmissible, because of the non-retroactivity of the European Convention on Human Rights:

See also
 Former eastern territories of Germany
 Federation of Expellees
 Flight and expulsion of Germans (1944–1950)

Notes

References
English language homepage of the Die Preußische Treuhand GmbH & Co. KG a. A.

Official comments
 — Polish Minister of the Foreign Affairs (2006–2007) 

{{citation |last=Bratza |first=Nicolas  |author-link=Nicolas Bratza |date=7 October 2008 |url=http://cmiskp.echr.coe.int/tkp197/view.asp?action=html&documentId=841872&portal=hbkm&source=externalbydocnumber&table=F69A27FD8FB86142BF01C1166DEA398649 |title=Decision as to the admissibility Application no. 47550/06 by Preussische Treuhand GMBH & CO. KG A. A. against Poland |publisher=European Court of Human Rights}}

Journals

In the news

Further reading

Clare Murphy. WWII expulsions spectre lives on BBC News online 2 August 2004
Stefan Theil Germany: Road to Better Days, Newsweek,  August, 2004 (backup site)
DW staff. German Post-War Refugees to Claim Polish Assets,  Deutsche Welle, 3 August 2004.
Penny Campbell Worldwatch:Pay Up Time Magazine, 12 September  2004.
DW staff. Warsaw-Berlin Tensions Rise Over Expellee Claims, Deutsche Welle, 6 September 2004.
Staff. Germans and Poles settle WWII row BBC News 27 September 2004
DW staff. Polish Leaders Criticize Latest German Compensation Claims Deutsche Welle 16 December 2006
Associated Press article. Polish prime minister urges parliament to affirm Poles' rights to property left by expelled Germans in the International Herald Tribune, 19 December 2006
Associated Press article. Polish foreign minister denies Warsaw wants to renegotiate 1990 border treaty with Germany, International Herald Tribune 20 December 2006
Mark Landler. Lawsuit Reopens Old Wounds in German-Polish Dispute New York Times 25 December 2006 ( backup site)
Staff. Claims of Ownership - How the Organisation "Prussian Trust" is Complicating Relations with Poland Deutsche Welle 27 December 2006
 W.Ż. Claims, Complaints & Controversy. Warsaw Voice,  3 January 2007
Jan Puhl and Andreas Wassermann. Suit Evokes Ghosts of War Spiegel Online 2 January 2007
 Tom Hundley. German claims from WW II rankle Poland's twin leaders, Chicago Tribune, 25 January 2007
Staff. EU partners Poland, German ministers tackle WWII-era claims DPA German Press Agency  31 January 2007 — From rawstory.com not a DPA website (a backup site)
Staff. Spiegel interview with former Polish Foreign Minister Wladyslaw Bartoszewski Spiegel Online 15 February 2007. paragraphs 24-27.

Companies based in Düsseldorf
Financial services companies of Germany
German irredentism